Bill Whelan (born 22 May 1950 in Limerick, Ireland) is an Irish composer and musician. He is best known for composing a piece for the interval of the 1994 Eurovision Song Contest. The result, Riverdance, was a seven-minute display of traditional Irish dancing that became a full-length stage production and spawned a worldwide craze for Irish dancing and Celtic music and also won him a Grammy. "Riverdance" was released as a single in 1994, credited to "Bill Whelan and Anúna featuring the RTÉ Concert Orchestra". It reached number one in Ireland for 18 weeks and number nine in the UK. The album of the same title reached number 31 in the album charts in 1995.

Whelan has also composed a symphonic suite version of Riverdance, with its premiere performed by the Ulster Orchestra on BBC Radio 3 in August 2014.

Biography
Whelan is a native of Limerick, and was educated at Crescent College. He gained his Bachelor of Civil Law degree at University College Dublin in 1973 and then went to King's Inns. In 2011, Whelan was awarded the UCD Foundation Day Medal in recognition of his outstanding achievements and his contribution to Irish music worldwide. While he is best known for his "Riverdance" composition and the theatrical show of the same name, Whelan has been involved in many ground-breaking projects in Ireland since the 1970s. As a producer he has worked with U2 (on their War album), Van Morrison, Kate Bush, The Dubliners, Planxty, Andy Irvine & Davy Spillane, Patrick Street, Stockton's Wing and fellow Limerickman Richard Harris.

As an arranger and composer, his credits include:

 The Seville Suite, which was inspired by the exploits of Aodh Rua Ó Dónaill from The Battle of Kinsale in 1601 until his arrival in Galicia to the welcome of The Spanish Earl of Caraçena. In addition to the orchestra, The Seville Suite includes Celtic Music on Uilleann Pipes, accordion, bodhrán, fiddle as well as Galician harp, whistles and pipes. 
 The Spirit of Mayo, performed by an 85-piece orchestra in Dublin's National Concert Hall and featuring a powerful Celtic drum corps and a 200 strong choir and choral group Anúna.
 Whelan's Celtic/Orchestral release, The Connemara Suite, features the Irish Chamber Orchestra along with soloists Zoë Conway, Morgan Crowley, Colin Dunne (Dance Percussion) and Fionnuala Hunt.

In theatre, Whelan received a Laurence Olivier Award nomination for his adaption of Gilbert and Sullivan's H.M.S. Pinafore. He wrote original music for 15 of W. B. Yeats's plays for Dublin's Abbey Theatre and his film credits include, Dancing at Lughnasa (starring Meryl Streep), Some Mother's Son, Lamb (starring Liam Neeson) and the award-winning At The Cinema Palace.

In 2022, Whelan's autobiography The Road To Riverdance was published.

Career timeline

Whelan's lifetime of musical endeavours include:

 1970 – Composes main theme for the film Bloomfield.
 1978 – Member of the jazz-rock band Stacc, who release a single on CBS.
 1979 – Joins Planxty on keyboards.
 1981 – Timedance, composed by Whelan and Dónal Lunny, and performed by Planxty, features in the interval of Eurovision. Timedance released as a Planxty record.
 1983 – Whelan produces "The Refugee" on the U2 album War.
 1984 – Film score for Lamb, with Van Morrison
 1985 – Produces and performs on Stockton's Wing's Live – Take One.
 1987 – Composes The O'Riada Suite.
 1989 – Joins board of Irish Music Rights Organisation (IMRO), on which he serves continuously until 1997.
 1990 – Produces and plays keyboards on Andy Irvine's album Rude Awakening, released in early 1991 on the Green Linnet Records label.
 1992 – Commissioned to compose The Seville Suite, released on the Tara Music label.
 1992 – Produces and plays keyboards on the Andy Irvine/Davy Spillane album EastWind, released on the Tara Music label.
 1992 – Produces and performs on Stockton's Wing's The Crooked Rose for the Tara Music label.
 1993 – Composes the orchestral work The Spirit of Mayo.
 1994 – Composes Riverdance for interval segment of the Eurovision Song Contest. The segment is an unprecedented success and spins off into the long-running stage show.
 1995 – Invited to serve on the Government Task Force set up by Minister Michael D. Higgins.
 1996 – Composes original music for Jim Sheridan/Terry George's film Some Mother's Son.
 1997 – Receives a Grammy Award for Best Musical Show Album for Riverdance.
 2000 – Riverdance opens on Broadway.
 2001 – Receives Lifetime Achievement Award from IMRO (Irish Music Rights Organisation)
 2006 – Receives Lifetime Achievement Award at the Meteor Music Awards.
 2008 – Releases his Celtic orchestral album The Connemara Suite on the Tara Music label.
 2010 - Joins the board of the National Music Education Programme.
 2011 - Inaugural inductee into IMRO Academy

Discography
As a keyboard player, or as an arranger, he has contributed to these albums:

 The Woman I Loved So Well  (Planxty) (1980)
 Words & Music  (Planxty) (1983)
 Irish Times (Patrick Street) (1990)
 Rude Awakening (Andy Irvine) (1991) Green Linnet Records
 East Wind (Andy Irvine & Davy Spillane) (1992) Tara Music 
 The Seville Suite (various artists) (1992) Tara Music
 Riverdance: Music from the Show (various artists) (1995) 
 The Best of Patrick Street (Patrick Street) (1995)
 Some Mother's Son (various artists) (1996)
 L'Imaginaire Irlandais (various artists) (1996)
 Roots of Riverdance (various artists) (1997)
 Dancing at Lughnasa (various artists) (1998)
 Riverdance on Broadway (various artists) (2000)
 Zoe Conway (Zoe Conway) (2002) Tara Music 
 A Christmas Carol  (various artists) (2007)
 The Connemara Suite (2008) Tara Music

References

External links
 
 Bill Whelan file at Limerick City Library, Ireland

1950 births
Living people
20th-century Irish people
21st-century Irish people
Alumni of King's Inns
Alumni of University College Dublin
Bodhrán players
Grammy Award winners
Irish composers
Irish keyboardists
Irish pianists
Musicians from County Limerick
Patrick Street members
People educated at Crescent College
Planxty members